Salvador Lucas Barbier or SLB (born July 12, 1969) is an American designer and creative director, widely known for his innovative and trailblazing professional skateboarding career.

Early life
Barbier was born and raised in Baton Rouge, Louisiana.

Career
An early pioneer of the signature skate shoe market, Barbier designed and endorsed the Etnies SLB 23, a shoe critically regarded as "one of the most iconic skate shoes of all time." This iconic shoe, initially released in 1993, has been reissued many times over due to continued demand. Following up the SLB 23 with his signature MID and 97 editions from ES Footwear, Barbier's design innovations contributed to the progression and evolution of modern skateboarding shoe design. In addition to the innovative design, these shoes also became the blueprint for skateboarding footwear endorsement deals.

As a professional skateboarder, Sal was one of the six members of the original Plan B lineup. One of his trademark moves, the “Sal Flip” is ingrained in modern skateboarding culture, and featured in popular skateboarding video games, instructional guides and training apps. He was the first professional skateboarder to maneuver a kickflip to board slide on a handrail and perform a front side big spin on a handrail. His legendary skills were immortalized in the classic 1989 skate video Hokus Pokus.

Barbier founded and directed several skate companies that shaped the market of the 90’s, and still have an influence on many of today’s brands. In his role as a creative director, Sal continues to work with the limited-edition Aesthetics Skateboards, and select collaborations.

Skate video parts
1989: Hokus Pokus - H-Street Skateboards
1991: This Is Not The New H-Street Video - H-Street Skateboards
1991: Schlossbach - Turn The Other Cheek
1991: Frontline Video - Quiet Storm
1992: Questionable - Plan B Skateboards
1993: Virtual Reality - Plan B Skateboards - video dedicated to Salvador Lucas Barbier
1994: Second Hand Smoke - Plan B Skateboards
1996: Eastern Exposure Zero - Dan Wolfe
2019: Boys Of Summer 2 - Logan Lara

References

External links
Paycheck – Sal Barbier and his Sal 23s - Transworld, 2004
Lost & Found: Sal Barbier Full Interview - Skateboarder, 2011
Sal Barbier — The Nine Club - 2017

1969 births
American skateboarders
Living people
African-American skateboarders
Sportspeople from Baton Rouge, Louisiana
21st-century African-American people
20th-century African-American sportspeople